Roogie's Bump is a 1954 American comedy film directed by Harold Young and written by Jack Hanley and Dan Totheroh. The film stars Robert Marriott, Ruth Warrick, Olive Blakeney, Robert F. Simon, William Harrigan and David Winters. The film was released on August 25, 1954, by Republic Pictures. It was remade in 1993 as Rookie of the Year.

Plot
A young boy who loves baseball develops a strange bump on his arm. The bump has such an effect on his pitching arm that he soon finds himself playing for a major league baseball team.

Cast      
Robert Marriott as Remington Rigsby
Ruth Warrick as Mrs. Rigsby
Olive Blakeney as Mrs. Andrews
Robert F. Simon as Boxi
William Harrigan as Red O'Malley
David Winters as Andy
Michael Mann as Benji
Archie Robbins as P.A. Ryker
Louise Troy as Kate
Guy Rennie as Danny Doowinkle
Tedd Lawrence as Sports Announcer
Michael Keane as Barney Davis
Roy Campanella as Himself
Billy Loes as Himself
Carl Erskine as Himself
Russ Meyer as Himself

References

External links 
 

1954 films
1950s sports comedy films
American sports comedy films
American baseball films
Republic Pictures films
Films directed by Harold Young (director)
1954 comedy films
American black-and-white films
1950s English-language films
1950s American films